Astronomy & Geophysics (A&G) is a scientific journal and trade magazine published on behalf of the Royal Astronomical Society (RAS) by Oxford University Press. It publishes a mixture of content of interest to astronomers and geophysicists: news reports, interviews, topical reviews, historical investigations, obituaries, meeting reports and updates on the activities of the RAS. Full-length articles are peer reviewed.

A&G was formed in 1997 as a 'glossy' replacement for the Quarterly Journal of the Royal Astronomical Society (QJRAS; 1960–1996); it continues the same volume numbering from QJRAS. Since its inception and to date the editor is Sue Bowler of the University of Leeds.

Scope
The journal covers astronomy, astrophysics, cosmology, planetary science, solar-terrestrial physics, global and regional geophysics, and the history of these subjects. It also publishes thematic articles regarding interdisciplinary research, science policy, news, opinions, correspondence, and book and software reviews. Royal Astronomical Society communications about events and people and obituaries are also within this journal's purview.

Furthermore, in keeping with the tradition of the Quarterly Journal of the Royal Astronomical Society, it publishes discussions of fundamental science and scientific debates. The journal also functions as a channel of communication between the membership, the Council, and the Society's Officers.

Contributions to Astronomy & Geophysics are not restricted to RAS members.

Abstracting and indexing 
The journal is abstracted and indexed in:
 Academic Search (including Academic Search Elite and Academic Search Premier)
 Current Contents/Physical, Chemical & Earth Sciences
 InfoTrac
 Meteorological & Geoastrophysical Abstracts
 ProQuest 5000
 Science Citation Index
 Scopus
According to the 2020 Journal Citation Reports, the journal has an impact factor of 0.549.

Quarterly Journal of the Royal Astronomical Society 

The Quarterly Journal of the Royal Astronomical Society  (Q. J. R. Astron. Soc) was published by 
the Royal Astronomical Society from September 1960 to December 1996, and was produced by Blackwell Science in its later period. During that time 37 volumes were issued. The journal included articles reviewing modern astronomy or geophysics, discussions about research topics, meeting reports, contributions about the history of science, and reports of astronomical research groups and institutes. It gave less emphasis to detailed scientific research papers, which instead were published in the society's Monthly Notices..

Before 1960 the Royal Astronomical Society had published proceedings of its activities in its Monthly Notices alongside research papers, and published research reviews in its Occasional Notes. The Quarterly Journal was established in 1960 to free the Monthly Notices to concentrate on original research, and the Occasional Notes were discontinued.

Editors of the Quarterly Journal 
David Dewhirst, 1960–1965
C. Andrew Murray, 1965–1970
A. Jack Meadows, 1970–1975
Simon Mitton, 1976–1980
David W. Hughes, 1981–1985
George H. A. Coles, 1986–1991
Robert C. Smith, 1992–1995
David W. Hughes, 1996.

Abstracting and indexing for Quarterly Journal of the Royal Astronomical Society 
The Quarterly Journal of the  Royal Astronomical Society was formerly indexed in: 
 GeoRef
 International Aerospace Abstracts
 Computer & Control Abstracts
 Electrical & Electronics Abstracts
 Physics Abstracts. Science Abstracts. Series A
 Chemical Abstracts

All articles are indexed, with abstracts, in the Astrophysics Data System, which includes scans of all pages. The ADS bibliographic code is QJRAS.

See also 
 Monthly Notices of the Royal Astronomical Society
 Geophysical Journal International

References

External links 
 

Astronomy journals
Astrophysics
Science and technology magazines published in the United Kingdom
Publications established in 1997
Bimonthly journals
English-language journals
Oxford University Press academic journals
Astronomy in the United Kingdom
Geophysics journals
Royal Astronomical Society academic journals
1997 establishments in the United Kingdom